Dawid Jarka (born 15 August 1987 in Świerklaniec) is a Polish professional footballer who plays as a striker for LKS Bełk.

Career

Club
In the summer 2010, he moved to Ruch Radzionków from Górnik Zabrze.

In July 2011, he joined GKS Katowice.

In August 2015, he joined Gwarek Tarnowskie Góry.

On 29 July 2022, Jarka moved to IV liga club LKS Bełk.

National team
He has also played for the Poland national under-21 football team.

References

External links
 

1987 births
Living people
People from Tarnowskie Góry County
Sportspeople from Silesian Voivodeship
Polish footballers
Association football forwards
Poland under-21 international footballers
Gwarek Zabrze players
Athlitiki Enosi Larissa F.C. players
Górnik Zabrze players
ŁKS Łódź players
Ruch Radzionków players
GKS Katowice players
GKS Tychy players
Polonia Bytom players
Odra Opole players
KS ROW 1964 Rybnik players
Ekstraklasa players
I liga players
II liga players
III liga players
IV liga players
Polish expatriate footballers
Expatriate footballers in Greece
Polish expatriate sportspeople in Greece